Plummers Point is a rural settlement in the Western Bay of Plenty District and Bay of Plenty Region of New Zealand's North Island. It is on a headland on the southern side of Tauranga Harbour, opposite Motuhoa Island, and between Mangawhai Bay and Te Puna Estuary. The East Coast Main Trunk forms its southern boundary.

Ongarahu Pā is on 12 to 15 metre-high cliffs at the northern end. It is well-preserved and a tourist attraction.

Demographics
It is part of the wider Omokoroa Rural statistical area.

Plummers Point had a population of 153 at the 2018 New Zealand census, an increase of 12 people (8.5%) since the 2013 census, and an increase of 21 people (15.9%) since the 2006 census. There were 60 households, comprising 69 males and 84 females, giving a sex ratio of 0.82 males per female. The median age was 51.2 years (compared with 37.4 years nationally), with 21 people (13.7%) aged under 15 years, 24 (15.7%) aged 15 to 29, 69 (45.1%) aged 30 to 64, and 36 (23.5%) aged 65 or older.

Ethnicities were 98.0% European/Pākehā, 5.9% Māori, and 2.0% Pacific peoples. People may identify with more than one ethnicity.

Although some people chose not to answer the census's question about religious affiliation, 49.0% had no religion, 35.3% were Christian and 2.0% had other religions.

Of those at least 15 years old, 30 (22.7%) people had a bachelor's or higher degree, and 15 (11.4%) people had no formal qualifications. The median income was $37,800, compared with $31,800 nationally. 27 people (20.5%) earned over $70,000 compared to 17.2% nationally. The employment status of those at least 15 was that 51 (38.6%) people were employed full-time, and 33 (25.0%) were part-time.

References

Western Bay of Plenty District
Populated places in the Bay of Plenty Region
Populated places around the Tauranga Harbour